Altamaha is an unincorporated community in Tattnall County, in the U.S. state of Georgia.

History
A post office called Altamaha was established in 1876, and remained in operation until 1945. The community takes its name from the nearby Altamaha River.

References

Unincorporated communities in Tattnall County, Georgia
Unincorporated communities in Georgia (U.S. state)